Army Service Component Commands (ASCCs) are U.S. Army commands responsible for recommendations to the Joint Force Commander on the allocation and employment of U.S. Army forces within a combatant command or further assigned to subordinate unified command. In the event that a combatant commander created a subordinate unified command the Department of the Army will form a matching Army component headquarters. 

In matching, the Secretary of the Army also has the authority to redirect service responsibilities outside of Army Service Command Component channels. The Command itself may also redirect administrative responsibility outside Army forces. ASCCs also server administrative control for some of its functions, this is also typically true among Reserve Component forces. Shared administrative control also applies to direct reporting units of the Army that typically perform single or unique functions.

Four types of command authority can be distinguished:
COCOM - combatant command: unitary control (not further delegatable by the combatant commander CCDR)
ADCON - administrative control of the command function of "obtaining resources, direction for training, methods of morale and discipline"
OPCON - operational control of say, sustainment, a command function, in this case, embodied in an Army Field Support Brigade (AFSB)
TACON - tactical control of say, sustainment, as embodied in a Contracting Support Brigade

The Theater Army 
According to U.S. Army Doctrine, a theater army headquarters is the army service component command assigned to a geographic combatant command. It is organized, manned and equipped to perform 3 roles:

 Theater army for the geographic combatant command
 Joint task force headquarters (with augmentation) for limited contingency operations
 Joint force land component headquarters (with augmentation) for limited contingency operations

A theater army is responsible for the administration and support of all United States Army forces assigned, attached,  under the operational control of a geographic combatant command or transitioning to that area of responsibility (AOR). For example, United States Army Central (Formerly the Third United States Army) which is a theater army is responsible for the administration and support of all U.S. Army forces assigned, attached, under the operational control of United States Central Command, or transitioning into its area of responsibility. The theater army also provides most of the administrative control and army support to forces deployed in the joint operations area. In addition to these functions the theater army has a significant role in: coordinating, supporting, integrating all formations above brigade forces into geographic combatant command plans for that area of responsibility, and providing common-user logistics and Army executive agent services for all Army and joint forces operating in that AOR. The theater army is also responsible for distribution, recovery, and redistribution of supplies and equipment in joint operations areas.  The theater army enables the combatant commander to employ across the scope of military operations.

Each theater army supports the Army strategic roles—prevent, shape, and win—and facilitates the use of landpower in JTFs

Theater Armies exercise operational control of all army forces under its command until the combatant commander attaches units to a subordinate joint command. The theater army retains administrative control of all army forces in the command regardless of whether the theater army has operational control over them; this responsibility extends to the entirety of the U.S. Army.

The theater army commander remains responsible to the Department of the Army for Service-specific requirements. This falls under the ADCON chain of authority

Theater Army in Army Service Component Command Role 
Responsibilities of a Service component are determined from Title 10; DODD 5101.1; DA Memo 1-10; and combatant commander’s daily operational requirements.

These responsibilities may include:

 Executing combatant commander's daily operation requirements
 Setting the theater
 Setting the Joint Operations Area
 Serve as a Joint Task Force or Joint Force land Component Commander for immediate crisis response and limited, small-scale operations
 Recommend proper employment, task organization, and command relationship of Army forces to the Joint Force Commander (JFC)
 Integrate Army forces into the execution of theater engagement plans, and accomplish any operational missions assigned by the Joint Force Commander 
 Select and nominate specific Army units for attachment to other subordinate commands
 Conduct joint training, including training of components of other Services for joint operations in which the Army is designated the lead service.
 Early in the planning process, inform the Joint Force Commander, other component or supporting commanders, and the combatant commander of planning for changes in logistic support that would affect operational capability or sustainability
 Develop program and budget requests that comply with combatant commander guidance on warfighting requirements and priorities.
 Inform the combatant commander of program and budget decisions that may affect joint operation planning.
 Provide AOR-wide contingency planning and coordination, develop and maintain operation and or contingency plans, update regionally focused intelligence estimates, and update Service supporting plans to the Combatant Commander theater campaign plan.
 Provide, as requested, supporting joint operation and exercise plans with necessary force data to support missions that may be assigned by the combatant commander.

Additionally, the theater army is also responsible for administrative control of all U.S. Army forces in that AOR during times of peace and war.

Combatant Commands and their Army Service Component Commands

References

United States Army
Command and control systems of the United States military